Bunagana–Rutshuru–Goma Road, is a road in Uganda and the Democratic Republic of the Congo, connecting the towns of Bunagana in Uganda with Bunagana in DRCongo. In addition the road connects these two towns to Bugani, Rutshuru, Rumangabo, Buhumba and Goma, all in DRCongo.

Location
The eastern end of this road is in Bunagana, Uganda, at the international border with DRCongo. The road travels in a general north-westerly direction, through the towns of Bunagana, DRCongo, Bugani to Rutshuru.

Overview
This road is an important transport corridor between Uganda and the Democratic Republics of the Congo. It is expected to boost Uganda's trade with DRC, in agricultural and manufactured products, including refined petroleum products, as Uganda enters the oil-production phase.

Upgrades and reconstruction
Before 2019, the road was gravel surfaced, in various stages of disrepair. In November 2019, Yoweri Museveni of Uganda and Félix Tshisekedi of the Democratic Republic of the Congo signed agreements in Entebbe, Uganda, to upgrade this road to bituminous surface, within twenty-four months, after the relevant ministers have agreed on implementation details.

The government of the DRC would be responsible for the remaining 80 percent of the cost. The two roads involved are: 1. the  Kasindi–Beni–Butembo Road and 2. the  Bunagana–Rutshuru–Goma Road.

The total cost of renovation and improvement is budgeted at US$334.3 million (UShs1.2 trillion). It is expected that after the road improvement, Uganda's exports to DR Congo will double, from the current $532 million (USh1.9 trillion) annually to $1.064 billion (USh3.8 trillion).

On 27 May 2021, the Deputy Prime Minister of DR Congo, Christophe Lutundula Apala, visited Uganda "to sign a key inter-governmental agreement on infrastructure", involving this and other roads.

See also
 List of roads in the Democratic Republic of the Congo
 List of roads in Uganda

References

External links
 Uganda and DR Congo to build cross-border roads As of 11 November 2019.

Roads in the Democratic Republic of the Congo
Roads in Uganda
Geography of the Democratic Republic of the Congo
Transport in the Democratic Republic of the Congo
Transport in Uganda
East African Community
Geography of Uganda